Will T Hare (March 30, 1916 – August 31, 1997) was an American actor who appeared on television and films, often playing old crusty figures and father/grandpa roles. Hare was born in Elkins, West Virginia, the son of Frances Laetitia (née Satterfield) and George Thomas Hare.

Career
Will had appeared on stage, screen, and television since he was 15. Becoming a veteran of stage for over a half of a century, Hare's film debut was Alfred Hitchcock's The Wrong Man (1956) and his final theatrical appearance was Me and Veronica in 1992. Hare's other distinctive film credits include roles in The Effect of Gamma Rays on Man-in-the-Moon Marigolds (1972), The Rose (1979), The Electric Horseman (1979), Enter the Ninja (1981), Eyes of Fire (1983), Silent Night, Deadly Night (1984), The Aviator (1985), Back to the Future (1985, as gun-toting farmer "Old Man Peabody"), Vendetta (1986) and Grim Prairie Tales (1990). Hare was also an active member of the Screen Actor's Guild for several years and also of the Actors Studio, where he died of a heart attack on August 31, 1997 during a rehearsal.

Hare also appeared in the cover art for the entire Chessmaster franchise of videogames created by The Software Toolworks.

Partial filmography
 The Greatest Gift (1954-1955) — Harold Matthews
The Wrong Man (1956) - Raymond McKaba (uncredited)
Without Each Other (1962) - Father
The Effect of Gamma Rays on Man-in-the-Moon Marigolds (1972) - Junk Man
Black Oak Conspiracy (1977) - Doc Roades
Heaven Can Wait (1978) - Team Doctor
Butch and Sundance: The Early Days (1979) - (uncredited)
The Rose (1979) - Mr. Leonard
The Electric Horseman (1979) - Gus
Enter the Ninja (1981) - Dollars
Pennies from Heaven (1981) - Father Everson
Eyes of Fire (1983) - Calvin
Silent Night, Deadly Night (1984) - Grandpa
The Aviator (1985) - Old Man
Back to the Future (1985) - Pa Peabody
Vendetta (1986) - Judge Waters
Grim Prairie Tales (1990) - Lee
Me and Veronica (1993) - Red
Mob Queen (1998) - Father Doyle (final film role)

References

External links
 
 Will Hare at the University of Wisconsin's Actors Studio audio collection

1916 births
1997 deaths
Male actors from West Virginia
American male film actors
American male stage actors
American male television actors
People from Elkins, West Virginia
20th-century American male actors